Bohodou is a town in the Kankan Region of Guinea.

Uranium mining has yet to take place in Guinea but is currently being explored as a natural resource.

Notes

Populated places in the Kankan Region